Spring Storms or Spring Storms in the Autumn of Life (German: Frühlingsstürme im Herbste des Lebens) is a 1918 German silent drama film directed by and starring Fern Andra. It also features Josef Peterhans and Reinhold Schünzel.

Cast
 Fern Andra as Gräfin von Hagen
 Josef Peterhans as Baron Joseph Königswart 
 Reinhold Schünzel as Reinhold, Neffe von Königswart 
 Hella Thornegg as Reinholds Mutter 
 Paul Meffert as Vater der Komtesse

References

Bibliography
 Bock, Hans-Michael & Bergfelder, Tim. The Concise CineGraph. Encyclopedia of German Cinema. Berghahn Books, 2009.

External links

1918 films
Films of the German Empire
German silent feature films
Films directed by Fern Andra
German black-and-white films
1918 drama films
German drama films
Silent drama films
1910s German films
1910s German-language films